Mens is a commune in the Isère department in southeastern France.

Geography
The neighboring communes are: Saint-Sébastien, Saint-Jean-d'Hérans, Cornillon-en-Trièves, Prébois and Saint-Baudille-et-Pipet.

Population

See also
 Col de la Croix Haute
Communes of the Isère department

References

Communes of Isère
Isère communes articles needing translation from French Wikipedia